Postage stamps have been used in Cameroon or Cameroun since the nineteenth century.

German protectorate 

Cameroon became a German Protectorate in 1884 and used German colonial stamps overprinted Kamerun in 1897. In 1900, the Yacht series common to all of German colonies were issued.

French occupation 

During World War I, from 1914 to 1916 it was occupied by Allied Troops. Stamps of Gabon overprinted Corps Expeditionnaire Franco-Anglais Cameroun in 1915, and stamps of Middle Congo overprinted Occupation Française du Cameroun in 1916 were used by the French forces in Cameroon until the 1920s.

Joint mandate 
 
In 1922 Britain and France were granted separate United Nations mandates. In the French mandate, stamps inscribed ‘Cameroun’ were issued from 1925. For the British mandate, see postage stamps and postal history of the British Cameroons.

Current issues 

The French mandate of Cameroun became an independent republic in 1960. Cameroon was joined by the southern part of British Cameroons in 1961 to form the Federal Republic of Cameroon. The country was renamed the United Republic of Cameroon in 1972, and the Republic of Cameroon in 1984. Today, issues vary in the language used. Some issues may be in French reading Rèpublique du Cameroun and others may be in English, reading Republic of Cameroon.

See also
 Postage stamps and postal history of the British Cameroons

References

Further reading
 Bratzel, M. P., Jr. The Postal Tariffs of Cameroun under French Administration, 1916-1959. Windsor, Ont.: MPB Canada, 2007  215p. + 1 CD-ROM.
 Bratzel, M. P., Jr. The Railroads of Cameroun and Associated Postal History. Windsor, Ont.: MPB Canada, 2009  
 Bratzel, M. P., Jr. The Wartime Revenue Stamps of Cameroun: A Critical Examination. Windsor, Ont.: MPB Canada, 1996  47p.
 Bratzel, M. P., Jr., H. Kraja and R.J. Maddocks. Les Oblitérations du Cameroun, 1914-1960. Windsor, Ontario: MPB Canada, 1990  83p.
 Bratzel, M. P., Jr., Michael St.J. Wright, and Marc Parren. The Postmarks and Postal History of Independent Cameroun, 1960 to date. Windsor, Ontario: MPB Canada, 2014  58p. with 571 additional pages on a searchable DVD.
 Herterich, Wolfgang. Kamerun im Krieg 1914-1918: Handbuch der Kriegspost. Waldkirch: W. Herterich, 1994 154p.
 Maddocks, R.J. Marking Time 1887-1987: A Century of Postmarks and Cachets of an African Town Kamerun - Douala. Nether Stowey, Somerset: House of Antiquity, M.S. Todd, 1989  Series Title: Cockrill series booklet; no. 62.
 Tchienehom, Jean-Vincent. Le Timbre Raconte ... 20 Ans d'Histoire du Cameroun (1958-1978). Yaounde: Ministere des Postes et Telecommunications, 1978 46p.

Communications in Cameroon
Cameroon
History of Cameroon by topic